The RT-15 was a mobile theatre ballistic missile deployed by the Soviet Union during the Cold War.  It was assigned the NATO reporting name SS-14 Scamp (alternately the SS-14 Scapegoat) and carried the GRAU index 8K96.

The RT-15 was an early Soviet attempt to develop a road-mobile theatre ballistic missile. It was intended to be capable of being launched from both sea and ground sites and had a maximum range of 2000–2500 km. The weapon's 'reaction time' in the normal readiness condition after its arrival at the launch site would have been 20 to 30 minutes and the 'holding time' at peak readiness (with a time of two to ten minutes before the missile could be launched) would be about a day.

RT-15 was developed by the S. P. Korolev design bureau (OKB-1) on the basis of the second and third stages of the RT-2 ICBM. The missile was carried on a T-10 heavy tank chassis in a sealed container with a striking resemblance to the US Atlas D ICBM. After missile erection, the container split longitudinally and was withdrawn.

The missile was developed in the early 1960s and was first seen on a mobile land launcher during May 1965. Six missiles were experimentally deployed with the 50th Independent Missile Battalion at the village of Lesnaya in Belorussia. The system was refused acceptance for general service, on the grounds that the launch support electronics was too bulky and fragile. The missiles at Lesnaya were decommissioned during March 1970.

Variants
 RT-25 modernized derivative
 RT-15M (RSM-25) MRBM and SLBM

Operators

See also 
 List of missiles
 Theatre ballistic missiles

External links 
 Global Security: RT-15

Theatre ballistic missiles
Cold War missiles of the Soviet Union
Arsenal Plant (Saint Petersburg) products
Military equipment introduced in the 1960s